Gronau (officially Gronau (Westf.), is a town in the district of Borken in North Rhine-Westphalia, Germany. It is located near the border with the Netherlands, approx. 10 km east of Enschede. Documentary evidence of Gronau dates to 1365.

The city is divided into the districts of Gronau and Epe.

Notable people 
The Dutch singer Rania Zeriri lives in Gronau. The Polish tennis player Agnieszka Radwańska grew up here; her father was a tennis coach at the local club. Blaise Nkufo, a Swiss footballer with African roots, former player of the Dutch football club FC Twente, lived in Gronau. , a German artist, grew up in Gronau.

Born in Gronau 
 Winfried Berkemeier (born 1953), footballer
 Bernd Düker (born 1992), footballer
 Rolf Eckrodt (born 1942), CEO of Mitsubishi Motors 2001–2005
 Tim Hölscher (born 1995), footballer
 Cengiz Koç (born 1977), former German heavyweight boxer of Turkish descent
  (1938–2006), painter, elder brother of Udo Lindenberg
 Udo Lindenberg (born 1946), singer and musician
 Gregor Luthe (born 1970 in Epe), chemist, toxicologist, nanotechnologist, inventor and entrepreneur
 Jens Wissing (born 1988), football player
 (in German)

Transport
Gronau can be reached by road via the Autobahn A 30 and A 31, the Dutch Rijksweg 35, the Bundesstraße B 54n. Gronau (Westf) railway station connects Gronau with Enschede in the Netherlands via the Dortmund–Enschede railway and the Münster–Enschede railway. The nearest airports are Münster Osnabrück International Airport and Enschede Airport Twente, although the latter has no scheduled flights.

Twin towns – sister cities

Gronau is twinned with:
Bromsgrove, England, United Kingdom
Epe, Netherlands
Mezőberény, Hungary

References

External links

Towns in North Rhine-Westphalia
Populated places established in the 1360s
Borken (district)